OAM may refer to:

Science and technology 
 Object access method, a function available in IBM's z/OS
 OCP Accelerator Module, a computer hardware design specification published by the Open Compute Project
 Operations, administration, and management, processes involved in maintaining a system, often a computer system
 Oracle Access Manager, a software component of the Oracle Identity Management software suite
 Orbital angular momentum (disambiguation) in physics

Other 
 Oamaru Aerodrome, New Zealand
 Observatorio Astronómico de Mallorca, an observatory in Spain
 U.S. Office of Alternative Medicine, whose duties have been taken over by the National Center for Complementary and Alternative Medicine (NCCAM)
 Official Museums of Amsterdam, Netherlands
 On a Mission (disambiguation)
 Order of Australia Medal, an Australian national honour
 Ozy and Millie, a furry webcomic
 Office of Air and Marine, a federal law enforcement agency within the U.S. Customs and Border Protection
 OverActive Media, an esports and entertainment company